Michałówka  is a village in the administrative district of Gmina Modliborzyce, within Janów Lubelski County, Lublin Voivodeship, in eastern Poland.

In 2005 the village had a population of 150.

References
 Gmina Modliborzyce official website

Villages in Janów Lubelski County